The men's doubles of the 2008 ECM Prague Open tournament was played on clay in Prague, Czech Republic.

Tomáš Cibulec and Jordan Kerr were the defending champions, but none competed this year, with both players competing separately in Munich at the same week.

Lukáš Dlouhý and Petr Pála won the title by defeating Dušan Karol and Jaroslav Pospíšil 6–7(2–7), 6–4, [10–6] in the final.

Seeds

Draw

Draw

External Links
 Main Draw
 Qualifying Draw

2008 - Men's Doubles
Prague Open